is a Japanese manga series written and illustrated by Kōji Seo. It was serialized in Kodansha's Weekly Shōnen Magazine from May 2008 to February 2014 and the chapters collected into 27 tankōbon volumes. The series follows the daily life of Haruto Kirishima as he becomes enamored with Yuzuki Eba.

A story arc from A Town Where You Live was adapted into an original video animation series called A Town Where You Live: Twilight Intersection by Tatsunoko Production in 2012. An anime television series adaptation animated by Gonzo aired from July to September 2013, later spawning a radio program, drama CD, and an image song. Reception towards the manga was mixed with reviewers praising the plot for its realism or panning it as predictable and cliché.

Plot
Years prior, Haruto Kirishima befriends Yuzuki Eba and asks her to return to his hometown, Shōbara, Hiroshima, if she is ever troubled. In the present, Yuzuki transfers to Shōbara due to her estrangement with her step-family. She helps Haruto develop a friendship with his current crush, Nanami Kanzaki, but Haruto ultimately falls in love with Yuzuki. He helps Yuzuki reconcile with her family which encourages her to return to Tokyo. The two begin a long-distance relationship until Yuzuki suddenly cuts all ties with him. Haruto transfers to Tokyo and learns Yuzuki has begun dating Kyousuke Kazama out of sympathy for his terminal illness. In response, Haruto declares he will take Yuzuki back prompting Kyousuke to take a risky surgery in order to compete for Yuzuki's love fairly. Following Kyousuke's death, Haruto and Yuzuki stop seeing each other out of guilt.

Two years later, Haruto has been dating Asuka Mishima. When he reunites with Yuzuki, the two realize they still love each other. Haruto ends his relationship with Asuka in order to be with Yuzuki which causes their friends to ostracize them. When Yuzuki's father objects to their relationship and attempts to relocate her, she runs away from home to live with Haruto; the two eventually earn her father's approval. After reconciling with their friends and graduating from university, Haruto takes a job that relocates him to Kōchi. Unable to sustain their relationship, the two break up; two years later, Haruto is transferred back to Tokyo and reunites with Yuzuki, who had been waiting for his return. The two are married shortly after.

Characters

Haruto is a high school student in Shōbara, Hiroshima. He has an earnest personality and chastises others when they are in the wrong. Because he often cooks for his family and friends, Haruto is skilled at cooking and considers it as a possible career. His older sister  lives in Tokyo in the dorm room next to the Akitsukis from Suzuka. He has a long-time crush on classmate Nanami Kanzaki, but his feelings shift towards Yuzuki as the series progresses. At the end of the series, he marries Yuzuki, has a son named Daiki, and opens up his own restaurant. In both Tatsunoko Production's and Gonzo's anime, he is voiced by Yoshimasa Hosoya.

Years prior to the series, Yuzuki attends a summer festival in Shōbara where she befriends Haruto. There, Haruto tells her to return if she is ever troubled. Since then, she grew fond of Haruto and plans to visit him one day. After her father's remarriage, Yuzuki feels estranged by her family and decides to attend school in Shōbara. Due to Haruto's intervention, Yuzuki is able to mend her relationship with her step-family, prompting her to return to Tokyo. There, the terminally ill Kyousuke Kazama asks Yuzuki to be his girlfriend for the remainder of his lifespan. Following Kyousuke's death, Yuzuki decides to stop seeing Haruto out of guilt. Reunited two years later, the two reaffirm their love, and begin dating. At the end of the series, she married Haruto and they have a son named Daiki. In both Tatsunoko Production's and Gonzo's anime, she is voiced by Megumi Nakajima.

 Hiroshima characters
 is Haruto's childhood friend. He is unpopular with women and faces rejection regularly. In college, he begins dating Kiyomi Asakura, whom he later marries when she becomes pregnant. In both Tatsunoko Production's and Gonzo's anime, he is voiced by Toshiki Masuda.
 is Haruto and Takashi's childhood friend. She is half Russian and half Japanese which gives her blond hair and blue eyes. After her father becomes ill, Akari drops out of university and returns to Hiroshima for work. She marries Nanami's brother Narumi, but beforehand, confesses her love to Haruto one last time to settle her feelings for him. In both Tatsunoko Production's and Gonzo's anime, she is voiced by Nana Kouno.
 is Haruto's classmate since middle school. She has an older brother named . Due to Yuzuki's efforts, Haruto is able to become close with Nanami and earns her affection. However, she postpones and rejects Haruto's confession as she sees Haruto's love towards Yuzuki. At Seijo University, she eventually dates another guy. In Tatsunoko Production's anime, she is voiced by Saori Hayami. In Gonzo's anime, she is voiced by Yuki Takao.
 is a girl Haruto meets during his summer job in a restaurant. She aspires to be a chef and is highly skilled and devoted to that profession; because of this, she is strict towards her co-workers. Three years later, she runs her own restaurant in Tokyo where Haruto works during his university years.

 Tokyo characters
 is Yuzuki's step-sister. She has a mischievous personality and enjoys flirting with Haruto. After learning that Haruto and Yuzuki had sex, she realizes that she loves Haruto and feels saddened by this revelation. She later appears in Hitman, another manga by Kōji Seo, where is the CEO of a mobile game company. In Tatsunoko Production's anime, she is voiced by Aoi Yuuki. In Gonzo's anime, she is voiced by Saki Fujita.
 is Haruto's neighbor and classmate after his transfer to Tokyo. Following Kyousuke's death and Haruto and Yuzuki's decision to stop seeing each other, she and Haruto begin dating. At the end of the series, she is a pitcher on Japan's national baseball team. She later appears in Hitman, where the protagonist is assigned to make a manga based on her life. In Gonzo's anime, she is voiced by Ayane Sakura.
 is Yuzuki's senior at school and becomes friends with Haruto. He uses his terminal illness to make Yuzuki his girlfriend. Upon learning about Yuzuki's relationship with Haruto, Kyousuke decides to undergo a risky surgery to cure his ailment and to win Yuzuki's love fairly; the surgery results in his death. In Gonzo's anime series, he is voiced by Daisuke Ono.
 is Haruto's high school classmate in Tokyo. Learning that Mina has tickets for an event at Yuzuki's school, Haruto accompanies her which causes her to believe they are on a date. She reappears as a member of the college circle that Haruto joins. There, she comes to believe she and Haruto are a couple again; she later ends this supposed relationship to be with another man. She appears in Gonzo's anime and is voiced by Sayuri Yahagi.
 is Kyousuke Kazama's childhood friend. She originally despises Yuzuki for her relationship with Kyousuke, and works with Haruto to try to split them apart. She confesses her love to Kyousuke before he undergoes his surgery. She begins dating Takashi and the two marry when she becomes pregnant. She appears in Gonzo's anime and is voiced by Aya Endo.
 is a business student at Seijo University. She stages an incriminating situation in order to blackmail Haruto into taking class notes for her. Despite her family's opposition, she decides to pursue her dream as a manga artist. She later appears as a supporting character in Hitman.
 is Haruto's neighbor during his university years. She does not have friends at the university and, because she has gone to an all-girls high school, has androphobia. After interacting with Haruto and Yuzuki, she becomes more social and studies abroad.
 is Yuzuki's student from her cram school job. She develops a crush on Haruto and decides to pursue him. When she becomes a high school student, she moves into Miyu's old apartment.

Publication and conception

Written and illustrated by Kōji Seo, A Town Where You Live was serialized in Kodansha's shōnen manga magazine Weekly Shōnen Magazine from May 28, 2008, to February 12, 2014. Seo stated he wanted to create a love story set in his hometown as the inspiration to the series and that some of his characters were inspired by his friends. Kouji Seo created a guide book titled  which was released on August 16, 2013. A special volume, titled   collecting nine previously released alternative chapters 200 (also serving as alternative endings with other heroines) was released on October 17, 2018. Six of those chapters were previously released with the limited edition of the Gonzo anime volumes, two with limited editions of manga volumes 26 and 27, and one as a bonus released by Amuse Soft Entertainment. A free epilogue chapter was released online on April 1, 2020.

On October 30, 2013, Crunchyroll Manga was launched and included A Town Where You Live in its library with English translation by Abby Lehrke; the series has also been published in languages such as French and Chinese.

Anime adaptations

Tatsunoko Production
 is a two episode original video animation series animated by Tatsunoko Production in collaboration with the city, Shōbara. Yasuhiro Yoshiura and Hiroshi Kobayashi were the directors with script by Momoko Murakami and music by Keiichi Oku. Project. The episodes were bundled with the limited edition manga volume 17 and 18; they were released on March 16 and June 15, 2012, respectively. The series covers Haruto Kirishima's class trip to Tokyo as he separates from his classmates to search for Yuzuki Eba.

Gonzo
A Town Where You Live was adapted into an anime television series animated by Gonzo. Shigeyasu Yamauchi was the director with script by Reiko Yoshida and music by Keiichi Oku. It was first announced in Weekly Shōnen Magazine, issue 15, 2013. To promote the show, a radio program consisting of the anime's voice cast was broadcast on Nippon Cultural Broadcasting between July 6 and July 27, 2013. The anime aired on TXN between July 13 and September 28, 2013. It was also broadcast on HOME and AT-X and was made available for streaming on networks such as Niconico and Bandai Channel. The remaining episodes' ending theme was Dear Friend by Daisuke Ono. Sentimental Love was released as a CD single by A-Sketch while Kimi no Iru Machi and Dear Friend were released by Universal Music Group. Right Stuf Inc.'s Nozomi Entertainment announced an English subtitled release for North America in July 2015. Each of the six limited edition DVD/Blu-ray volumes of the series included a bonus manga chapter that serves as an alternative chapter 200 and an alternative ending with other heroines.

Gonzo also animated two original video animation episodes which are bundled with the limited editions of manga volume 26 and 27. Gonzo's anime adaptation resulted in a drama CD and an image song release.

Episode list

Reception
In Japan, A Town Where You Live manga volumes frequently appeared on weekly sales charts during their week of release. Jason Thompson praised A Town Where You Lives serious, mature tone and wrote that the audiences will either like the series for its realism or criticize it as slow and mundane. Manga-News praised the series' introduction for being more realistic than the author's previous work, Suzuka, and the plot which was described as eventful. In later volumes, Manga-News criticized the plot for being predictable, encompassing cliché aspects of the genre, and for dragging its story. They also panned the characters' behavior, calling it implausible and inconsistent. Manga-News returned to positive reviews during the volumes involving Kyousuke Kazama; they praised the story arc for introducing a new setting, for breaking away from the usual classicism, and for surprising the readers for the first time in the series. Following this, Manga-News returned to negative reviews, echoing their previous points. AnimeLand had similar reactions. Initially, they were positive, praising the realistic protagonist, but further reviews repeated Manga-News' criticisms.

Works cited
 "Ch." is shortened form for chapter and refers to a chapter number of the A Town Where You Live manga.

Japanese notes and terminology

References

External links
Manga
 at Crunchyroll Manga
 at Kodansha 

Anime
 
 

Gonzo (company)
Kodansha manga
Romance anime and manga
Shōnen manga
Tatsunoko Production
Works by Kōji Seo